Česká automobilová společnost pro obchod a montáž motorových vozidel, formerly Bratři Rechzieglovi, was a Czech manufacturer of motorcycles and automobiles.

History
Based in Prague, the company began producing motorcycles in 1920 and later automobiles in 1921 under the brand name ČAS. Production ended around 1924.

Vehicles

Motorcycles
They produced a two-cylinder boxer engine with either a 129cc or 174cc engine. They later made a single-cylinder engine.

Automobile
A year later, they produced a small four-wheeled two-seater automobiles. Powered by a single-cylinder two-stroke engine with a displacement choice of 250cc or 350cc. According to other sources, they used a 689cc air-cooled two-cylinder engine from Coventry-Victor as well as a two-cylinder engines from  Walter in later models.

Literature 
 Harald H. Linz, Halwart Schrader: Die Internationale Automobil-Enzyklopädie. United Soft Media Verlag, Munich 2008, ISBN 978-3-8032-9876-8. (German)
 George Nicholas Georgano (Editor-in-chief.): The Beaulieu Encyclopedia of the Automobile. Band 2: P–Z. Fitzroy Dearborn Publishers, Chicago 2001, ISBN 1-57958-293-1. (English).

References 

Motor vehicle manufacturers of Czechoslovakia
Defunct motor vehicle manufacturers of Czechoslovakia
Motorcycles introduced in the 1920s
Defunct motorcycle manufacturers
Vehicle manufacturing companies established in 1921
Vehicle manufacturing companies disestablished in 1924